The 2006–07 Pervaya Liga season was the 15th season of the Pervaya Liga, the third level of ice hockey in Russia.

Central Zone

Volga Zone

Regular season

Final round

Ural-Western Siberia Zone

Regular season

Final round

Eastern Siberia Zone

External links 
 Season on hockeyarchives.info

3